Roknolmolk Mosque is a historical mosque in Isfahan. This mosque has been built in Qajar era and is close to Takht-e Foulad. It was built by Mirza Soleyman Khan Shirazi "Roknolmolk", who was a prominent personage in Isfahan. The Portal of the mosque has been decorated with the Roknolmolk's paintings and poems.

See also
 Islam in Iran

References 

Mosques in Isfahan
Qajar architecture
Takht-e Foulad